3 November 1945 declaration is an Indonesian declaration which encourages the formation of political parties as part of democracy. This declaration is released for the preparation of election implementation. This declaration can be referred as pioneer of democracy in Indonesia. With this declaration, the government hopes that political parties can be formed before the legislative election in January 1946. This declaration legitimized the political parties that have formed since the Dutch and Japanese periods and also encourage the continued birth of a new political parties.  However, the stabilization of democracy in Indonesia through the plan of 1946 election cannot be realized. This is because Indonesian people focus on the struggle for independence as a result of the arrival of Allied military forces. At that time, the election is no longer a priority.

References 

Elections in Indonesia
1946 elections in Asia
1945 documents
Indonesian National Revolution
November 1945 events in Asia